Cyanidin-3,5-O-diglucoside, also known as cyanin, is an anthocyanin. It is the 3,5-O-diglucoside of cyanidin.

Natural occurrences 
Cyanin can be found in species of the genus Rhaponticum (Asteraceae).

In food 
Cyanin can be found in red wine as well as pomegranate juice according to a study done by Graça Miguel, Susana Dandlen, Dulce Antunes, Alcinda Neves, and Denise Martins in the winter of 2004.  Pomegranate juice extracted through centrifugal seed separation has higher amounts of cyanidin-3,5-O-diglucoside than juice extracted by squeezing fruit halves with an electric lemon squeezer.

See also 
 Phenolic content in wine

References

External links 

Anthocyanins
Flavonoid glucosides